On December 15, 1815, having been elected to the Senate, Nathaniel Macon (DR) of  resigned.  To fill the vacancy left in North Carolina's representation for the 14th Congress, a special election was held on January 22, 1816.

Election results

Edwards took his seat on February 7, 1816, during the First Session of the 14th Congress.

See also
 List of special elections to the United States House of Representatives
 1816 and 1817 United States House of Representatives elections
 List of United States representatives from North Carolina

References

1816 06
North Carolina 1816 06
North Carolina 06
North Carolina 06
United States House of Representatives 06
United States House of Representatives 1816 06